National Geographic Kids (often nicknamed to Nat Geo Kids) is a children's magazine published by the National Geographic Society.  Its first issue was printed in September 1975 under the original title National Geographic World (which itself replaced the much older National Geographic School Bulletin, published weekly during the school year from 1919 to 1975; currently National Geographic produces a separate magazine for classroom use called "National Geographic Explorer," in four separate editions for different grades).

The magazine was published for twenty-six years as National Geographic World, until the title of the magazine was changed in 2002 to National Geographic Kids. In a broad sense, the publication is a version of National Geographic, the flagship magazine of the National Geographic Society, that is intended for children.

Publication and readers
National Geographic Kids publishes ten issues annually. The headquarters of the magazine is in Washington, D.C. As of June 2006, the magazine reports a circulation of more than 1.3 million in English, with an estimated English language readership of more than 4.6 million. There also are eighteen editions of National Geographic Kids in different languages instead of English, published in Bulgaria, Croatia, Egypt, Germany, Greece, Hungary, Indonesia, Israel, Italy, Latin America, Lithuania, Benelux, Poland, Romania, Russia, Serbia, Slovenia, Turkey and the United Kingdom. The magazine is written for children between the ages of 6 and 14. It has an advisory board of 500 subscribers and solicits reader feedback after each issue.

Both the English and Afrikaans editions published in South Africa were converted to digital-only in June 2020. It had published in print for 16 years.

The magazine recently launched a spin-off, National Geographic Little Kids, targeted toward children 3–6 years of age.

In 2009 the magazine launched their first almanac called National Geographic Kids Almanac 2010. In 2010 the almanac continued with an updated book, National Geographic Kids Almanac 2011. There have been new updates to the almanac issued annually since then.

List of world atlases
World Atlas 1st Edition
World Atlas 2nd Edition
World Atlas 3rd Edition (2010)
World Atlas 4th Edition (2014)
World Atlas 5th Edition (2018)

World Atlas 6th Edition (2021)

Features

These are some of the regular features, most of which appear periodically, 
 Amazing Animals
 Fun Stuff (formerly called "Kids' Express")
 The Inside Scoop (formerly called "World News")
 Kids Did It!
 Go On Safari!
 What in the World? (this is one of the two features to appear in every issue)
 Video Game Central (formerly called "The Next Level")
 Weird But True (which later became a Disney+ original series, Weird But True!)
 Cool Inventions
 Stupid Criminals
 Just Joking (this is the other of the two features to appear in every issue)
 Sports Funnies (comical pictures of people in sports)
 Guinness World Records
 Wildlife Watch
 Unleashed (a comic strip about three house pets by Strika Entertainment)
 Naughty Pets (funny photos of pets behaving badly)
 The Green List
 Bet You Didn't Know (similar to Weird But True, but issue seasonal)
 The Big Book Of Why
 Quiz Whiz

Anniversary issues
The 25th anniversary issue in September 2000 was well publicized. It featured a "Top 25" list of the things readers most enjoyed (the magazine covers were #1) a collection of cards people had sent to the magazine, and a special "Kids Did It" column that featured updates on the lives of celebrities who had been featured in the magazine when they were children, such as Michelle Kwan.

The 30th anniversary issue in September 2005 featured an article describing what life might be like in thirty years (in 2035). It also featured thirty "cool things" of the future.

See also

 Science education
 Nat Geo Kids Abu Dhabi
 Nat Geo Kids (Latin American TV channel)

Notes

References
  National Geographic Kids Media Kit URL accessed on November 16, 2007

External links
 

Children's magazines published in the United States
Magazines established in 1975
National Geographic Society magazines
Magazines published in Washington, D.C.
National Geographic Partners
Ten times annually magazines
1975 establishments in Washington, D.C.